Ritsuo (written: 律夫 or 律雄) is a masculine Japanese given name. Notable people with the name include:

, Japanese baseball player
, Japanese politician

Japanese masculine given names